Dekay, DeKay, or De Kay may refer to:

People
James Ellsworth De Kay (1792–1851), American zoologist
Tim DeKay (born 1963), American actor
William DeKay, Canadian photojournalist
Daniel Dekay, guitarist for the band Exciter

Other
"Dekay", a song by Ho99o9 from the album United States of Horror